Robert Scott Dobie (born 10 October 1978) is a Scottish former footballer who played as a striker.

Although born in England, Dobie played six times for Scotland at full international level in 2002. During a 16-year career he played for Carlisle United, Clydebank, West Bromwich Albion, Millwall, Nottingham Forest, St Johnstone, Bradford City and York City.

Club career

Carlisle United
Born in Workington, Cumbria, Dobie joined Carlisle United as an apprentice in June 1995, turning professional on 10 May 1997. While at Carlisle, it was Dobie's goalbound header that was parried into the path of Carlisle goalkeeper Jimmy Glass, who scored with the last kick of the final game of the 1998–99 season, preserving Carlisle's Football League status and relegating Scarborough. During 2000–01, Dobie attracted interest from other clubs, with Carlisle manager Ian Atkins claiming that the player could be worth as much as £2 million in the transfer market.

West Bromwich Albion
Dobie was transferred to West Bromwich Albion on 6 July 2001 for an initial £150,000 fee, with another £50,000 being paid once he reached 25 appearances for his new club. He made his Albion début against Walsall on 11 August 2001. His first goal for the club came on 22 August 2001 in a League Cup tie at Cambridge United, when he lobbed the opposition goalkeeper from 30 yards out. He enjoyed an impressive September, scoring his first league goal for Albion in a 4–0 win over Manchester City, and thus commencing a scoring streak of eight goals in seven games. However he struggled to find the net after that, not scoring again until February. Nonetheless, he finished the season as the club's top scorer with 11 league goals, 13 in total. His performances helped Albion get promoted to the Premier League in 2001–02. Two of his goals came on 16 March 2002 in a 3–0 win at Sheffield United; the game was dubbed the "Battle of Bramall Lane" as it was the only game in English professional football to be abandoned due to a team having insufficient players left on the pitch.

In the summer he handed in a transfer request, reportedly because he wanted a wage increase after breaking into the Scotland national side. Albion refused to sell the player however, and eventually Dobie was rewarded with an improved four-year contract. Dobie was Albion's first Premier League substitute when he replaced Danny Dichio in the opening game against Manchester United at Old Trafford. He scored just five times in Albion's first Premiership season, although his strike against Tottenham Hotspur on 8 December 2002 was named 'Goal of the Week' by the BBC Sport website. Albion were relegated, but Dobie again won promotion with them in 2003–04, helping the club bounce back to the top-flight at the first attempt.

Millwall
With the likes of Kanu and Robert Earnshaw ahead of him in the West Brom pecking order, Dobie struggled to gain first team action at the start of 2004–05, and on 8 November 2004 moved to Millwall in a deal worth "up to" £750,000. Owing to a sell-on clause, his former club Carlisle received at least £37,500 from the deal.

Nottingham Forest
On 25 February 2005 he joined Nottingham Forest in a £525,000 move from Millwall, signing a three-and-a-half-year deal. His Forest career got off to a slow start, as he scored only one goal in 12 appearances. He then started to find his form, but a series of injuries, including a hip injury that required ground-breaking surgery in America, checked his progress, meaning he scored just two goals in the 2005–06 season.

At the start of the 2006–07 season new manager Colin Calderwood expressed his faith in Dobie and said his career was safe at Forest. But injury again slowed his progress, after suffering a thigh injury on his comeback game, forcing him down the pecking order behind Grant Holt, Junior Agogo and Nathan Tyson. Most of Dobie's appearances in 2006–07 were from the substitutes bench. His only goal that season came in the 2006–07 League One play off semi-final against Yeovil. His header from a corner, put Forest 3–1 up in the tie, but they ended up losing 5–4 on aggregate after extra time.

Dobie began the 2007–08 campaign as a lone striker against AFC Bournemouth but was quickly dropped to the bench, and then cut from the matchday squad altogether, although he returned as a substitute in Forest's 2–0 win at Port Vale.

Return to Carlisle
On 23 January 2008, Dobie returned to Carlisle United, now in League One, where he signed a two-and-a-half-year contract after moving for a nominal fee. He was on the losing side in a play-off semi-final for the second year running when Carlisle were defeated 3–2 on aggregate by Leeds United, whose team included Dobie's half-cousin Paul Huntington. Dobie received the first red card of his career in a 0–0 draw against Leyton Orient in August 2008.

St Johnstone
Dobie signed for Scottish Premier League club St Johnstone on a one-year contract in May 2010. Dobie had previously played alongside Saints manager Derek McInnes at West Brom. He played just four games for the Scottish outfit. Dobie signed for League Two side Bradford City in February 2011 on a loan deal until the end of the season.

York City
After more than a year without a club, Dobie signed for newly promoted League Two club York City on a three-month contract on 30 August 2012. However, he was released a month later on 28 September 2012 after failing to break into the team.

International career
Dobie represented Scotland at international level. He made his debut in a 4–1 defeat away to South Korea on 16 May 2002, in which he scored Scotland's only goal. He was capped six times by Scotland, all of these coming during 2002.

Career statistics

Club

International

International goals
Scores and results list Scotland's goal tally first.

After football
After retiring from football, Dobie became a police officer. He is now an Authorised Firearms Officer and National Firearms Instructor, and has provided armed protection at Merry Hill Shopping Centre in Dudley.

See also
 List of Scotland international footballers born outside Scotland

References

External links

1978 births
Living people
Sportspeople from Workington
English footballers
Scottish footballers
Scotland international footballers
Association football forwards
Carlisle United F.C. players
Clydebank F.C. (1965) players
West Bromwich Albion F.C. players
Millwall F.C. players
Nottingham Forest F.C. players
St Johnstone F.C. players
Bradford City A.F.C. players
York City F.C. players
Premier League players
English Football League players
Scottish Premier League players
Scottish Football League players
English people of Scottish descent
Anglo-Scots
British police officers
Footballers from Cumbria